Foulgo may refer to:

Foulgo, Boudry, Burkina Faso
Foulgo, Salogo, Burkina Faso